The Diocese of Iba (Lat: Dioecesis Ibanae) is a Roman Rite diocese of the Latin Church of the Catholic Church in the Philippines.

The diocese began on 12 June 1955 as a territorial prelature from territory in the dioceses of San Fernando, Pampanga, and of Diocese of Lingayen-Dagupan and was elevated to a diocese on 15 November 1982.  The diocese is a suffragan of the Archdiocese of San Fernando in Pampanga.

On 17 February 2018, Bartolome G. Santos Jr., the vicar general of the Diocese of Malolos and rector of the National Shrine of Our Lady of Fatima was designated as the new bishop replacing Florentino G. Lavarias who vacated the post after his installation as the Archbishop of the Archdiocese of San Fernando, Pampanga. The latter also served as a co-consecrator for Bishop Santos's ordination alongside Manila Archbishop Cardinal Luis Antonio G. Tagle who served as principal consecrator and the late Malolos Bishop Jose F. Oliveros, and as installing prelate during his installation.

Coat of Arms
The transfixed flaming heart is the symbol of Augustine of Hippo, Doctor of the Church, who is the titular of the cathedral. The bezants represent the great wealth found in the Zambales mountains which cover the territory of the diocese.

Ordinaries

Priests from the Diocese of Iba who became bishops
Daniel O. Presto, 6th Bishop of the Diocese of San Fernando de La Union.
Teodoro Bacani, Bishop Emeritus of the Diocese of Novaliches.

See also
Catholic Church in the Philippines
List of Catholic dioceses in the Philippines

References

External links
 Diocese of Iba page on the Catholic Bishops Conference of the Philippines website
 Diocese of Iba Facebook Page

Iba
Iba
Religion in Zambales